Yves Andréas Manga (born 15 October 1980) is a French football defender of Senegalese origin. He is currently without a club after being released by Perpignan Canet FC.

The reason for this release was the reckless behaviour on the pitch during the 2007-08 season. After 24 matchdays, Manga had received red cards against Tubize, VW Hamme and OH Leuven. On matchday 25, against Antwerp, Manga made a dangerous two-footed challenge on Luciano Olguín. He only received a yellow card, but was substituted during the break after some other risky interventions.

References

1980 births
Living people
French footballers
K.S.K. Beveren players
Canet Roussillon FC players
French sportspeople of Senegalese descent
Royale Union Saint-Gilloise players
Association football defenders
AS Choisy-le-Roi players